Nymphargus megacheirus is a species of frog in the family Centrolenidae, formerly placed in Cochranella.
It is found in Colombia and Ecuador.
Its natural habitats are subtropical or tropical moist montane forests and rivers.
It is threatened by habitat loss.

References

megacheirus
Amphibians of Colombia
Amphibians of Ecuador
Taxonomy articles created by Polbot
Amphibians described in 1973